Leeming Bar railway station is a railway station in Leeming Bar, North Yorkshire, England. It is the eastern rail passenger terminus of the Wensleydale Railway, though the line continues towards . Trains are timed to link in with Dales and District service buses to Northallerton to connect with the National Rail network.

History

The station was opened by the York, Newcastle and Berwick Railway (a constituent company of the North Eastern Railway) in 1848 as the terminus of their branch from Northallerton. The station building was probably designed by George Townsend Andrews who may also have designed the Grade II listed locomotive shed.

The line was then extended westwards to Leyburn by the Bedale and Leyburn Railway seven years later. A single-road locomotive shed was built at the west end of the station when the station opened up in 1848. A shed had been proposed at Bedale as the intended terminus of the line, but with the extension to Leyburn, the shed at Leeming was retained.

The station was located on the start of a two-track section to Bedale, with two platforms and a 36-lever signal box. The station was originally called Leeming Lane due to being sited on a level crossing on the Great North Road. However, in July 1902, it was renamed Leeming Bar.

It closed to passengers in April 1954 when the Northallerton to Hawes service fell victim to road competition, but reopened under Wensleydale Railway ownership in the summer of 2003.

Preservation

As well as the scheduled passenger service, the station also sees periodic train loads of military hardware travelling between Catterick Garrison and various destinations in the south of England via Northallerton and the East Coast Main Line.

Plans are for passenger trains to eventually continue through Leeming Bar and run into Northallerton railway station. It is hoped to recommence services to Northallerton West at a future date once work to upgrade level crossing equipment is complete.

Leeming Bar is also the location of the Wensleydale Railway's main depot where its rolling stock is stored and is visible from the A1.

The station building, on the south side of the railway station, is grade II listed with a classic portico entrance, which faces out onto the road over the level crossing which used to be the Great North Road. The station building was renovated in 2021. The former engine shed, which is now used by the heritage railway, is also grade II listed.

References

External links

Heritage railway stations in North Yorkshire
Railway stations in Great Britain opened in 1848
Railway stations in Great Britain closed in 1954
Railway stations in Great Britain opened in 2003
Former North Eastern Railway (UK) stations
Grade II listed buildings in North Yorkshire